Béchir is a village in the commune of Tamtert, in El Ouata District, Béchar Province, Algeria.

References

Neighbouring towns and cities

Populated places in Béchar Province